Gaura Pant (17 October 1923 – 21 March 2003), better known as Shivani, was a Hindi writer of the 20th century and a pioneer in writing Indian women-centric fiction. She was awarded the Padma Shri for her contribution to Hindi literature in 1982.

She garnered a following in the pre-television era of 1960s and 1970s, and her literary works such as Krishnakali, were serialised in Hindi magazines like Dharmayug and Saptahik Hindustan. Through her writings, she also made the culture of Kumaon known to the Hindi speakers in India. Her novel Kariye Chima was made into a film, while her other novels including Surangma, Rativilaap, Mera Beta, and Teesra Beta have been turned into television serials.

Early life 
Gaura Pant 'Shivani' was born on 17 October 1923, the Vijaya Dasami day in Rajkot, Gujarat, where her father, Ashwini Kumar Pande was a teacher with princely state of Rajkot. He was a Kumaoni Brahmin. Her mother was a Sanskrit scholar, and the first student of Lucknow Mahila Vidyalaya. Later her father became the Diwan with the Nawab of Rampur and the member of Viceroy's Bar Council, thereafter the family moved to the princely state of Orchha, where her father held an important position. Thus Shivani's childhood had influences of these varied places, and an insight into women of privilege, which reflected in much of her work. At Lucknow, she became the first student of the local Lucknow Mahila Vidyalaya.

In 1935, Shivani's first story was published in the Hindi Children's magazine Natkhat, at age twelve. That was also when, the three siblings were sent to the study at Rabindranath Tagore's Visva-Bharati University at Shantiniketan. Shivani remained at Shantiniketan for another 9 years, left as a graduate in 1943. Her serious writings started during the years spent at Shantiniketan. It was this period that she took to writing whole-heartedly and had the most profound influence in her writing sensibilities, a period she recounts vividly in her book, Amader Shantiniketan.

Family 
Shivani was married to Shuk Deo Pant, a teacher who worked in the Education Department of Uttar Pradesh, which led to the family travelling to various places including Allahabad and Priory Lodge in Nainital, before settling in Lucknow, where she stayed till her last days. She had four children, seven grandchildren and three great-grandchildren.

Her husband died at an early age, leaving her to take care of the four children. She had three daughters, Veena Joshi, Mrinal Pande and Ira Pande, and a son Muktesh Pant

Literary career
In 1951, her short story, Main Murga Hun ('I am a Chicken') was published in Dharmayug under the pen name Shivani. She published her first novel Lal Haveli in the sixties, and over the next ten years she produced several major works which were serialised in Dharmayug. Shivani received the Padma Shri for her contribution to Hindi literature in 1982.

She was a prolific writer; her bibliography consists of over 40 novels, many short stories and hundreds of articles and essays. Her most famous works include Chaudah Phere, Krishnakali, Lal Haveli, Smashan Champa, Bharavi, Rati Vilap, Vishkanya, Apradhini. She also published travelogues such as Yatriki, based on her London travels, and Chareivati, based on her travels to Russia.

Towards the end of her life, Shivani took to autobiographical writings, first sighted in her book, Shivani ki Sresth Kahaniyan, followed by her two-part memoir, Smriti Kalash and Sone De, whose title she borrowed from the epitaph of 18th-century Urdu poet Nazeer Akbarabadi:

Shivani continued to write till her last days, and died on 21 March 2003 in New Delhi.

Death and legacy 
Upon her death, the Press Information Bureau said that "the Hindi literature world has lost a popular and eminent novelist and the void is difficult to fill".

In 2005, her daughter, Hindi writer Ira Pande, published a memoir based on Shivani's life, titled Diddi My Mother's Voice. Diddi in Kumaoni means elder sister, and that's how her children used to address her, as she really was a friend to them.

Bibliography 
 Chareiveti — A narrative of travel in Russia and her encounters with literary figures
 Atithi (1991) — A novel whose central character, Jaya, after a failed marriage meets Shekhar who proposes to her
 Pootonvali (1998)  — A collection of two novelettes and three short stories
 Jharokha (1991) 
 Chal Khusaro Ghar Aapne (1998)
 Vatayan (1999)
 Ek Thi Ramrati (1998)
 Mera Bhai/Patheya (1997) — A novella and her recollections of events and personages
 Yatrik (1999) — Her experiences in England where she travelled for the marriage of her son
 Jaalak (1999) — 48 short memoirs
 Amader Shantiniketan (1999) — Reminiscences of Shantiniketan
 Manik — Novellette and other stories (Joker and Tarpan)
 Shmashan Champa (1997)
 Surangma — A novel about a political figure and his personal life shadowed by sordid relationships
 Mayapuri — A novel about relationships
 Kainja — A novel and 7 short stories
 Bhairvee — A novel
 Gainda — A novel and two long stories
 Krishnaveni — A novelette and two short stories
 Swayam Sidha — A novel and 6 short stories
 Kariya Cheema — 7 short stories
 Up Preti — 2 short novels, a story and 13 nonfictional articles
 Chir Swayamvara — 10 short stories and 5 sketches
 Vishkanya — A novelette and 5 short stories
 Krishnakali — A novel
 Kastoori Mrig — A short novel and several articles
 Aparadhini — A novel
 Rathya — A novel
 Chaudah Phere — A novel
 Rati Vilap — 3 novelettes and 3 short stories
 Shivani ki Sresth Kahaniyan —13 short stories
 Smriti Kalash — 10 essays
 Sunhu Taat Yeh Akath Kahani — Autobiographical narratives
 Hey Dattatreya — Folk culture and literature of Kumaon
 Manimala Ki Hansi — Short stories, essays, memoirs and sketches
 Shivani ki Mashhoor Kahaniyan — 12 short stories

English translations
 Trust and other stories. Calcutta: Writers Workshop, 1985.
 Krishnakali and other stories. Trans. by Masooma Ali. Calcutta: Rupa & Co., 1995. .

See also
Kumauni People

References

Further reading 
 Diddi, My Mother's Voice. Ira Pande, January 2005, Penguin. .

External links 
 A Conservative Rebel: Memories of an Unusual Mother, a Memoir, by Ira Pande
  A conversation with Ira Pande on her mother Shivani

 Works online
 Laati, a story by Shivani
 Lal Haveli, a story by Shivani
 Piti Hui Got, a story by Shivani

1924 births
2003 deaths
Hindi-language writers
Recipients of the Padma Shri in literature & education
Visva-Bharati University alumni
Women writers from Gujarat
People from Rajkot district
Literature of Kumaon
20th-century Indian women writers
20th-century Indian short story writers
Indian women short story writers
Indian women essayists
20th-century Indian essayists
Writers from Gujarat